Allan Lewis may refer to:

Allan Lewis (baseball) (born 1941), former baseball player
Allan Lewis (footballer) (born 1971), Welsh former professional footballer
Allan Lewis (rugby union) (born 1942), former Wales international rugby union player
Allan Leonard Lewis (1895–1918), English recipient of the Victoria Cross

See also
Alan Lewis (disambiguation) 
Alun Lewis (disambiguation)
Allen Lewis (disambiguation)
Lewis Allen (disambiguation)